The  or NSE (New Super Express) was an electric multiple unit (EMU) train type  operated by the Odakyu Electric Railway on Romancecar services in the Tokyo area of Japan between 1963 and 2000.

Operations
The 3100 series sets were used on Hakone, Ashigara, and Sagami services.

Interior

Preserved examples

References

Electric multiple units of Japan
03100 series NSE
Train-related introductions in 1963
Articulated passenger trains

1500 V DC multiple units of Japan